XHPOR-FM is a radio station on 98.7 FM in Putla Villa de Guerrero, Oaxaca, known as Tprende.

History
XEPOR-AM 890 received its concession on August 8, 1991. It was owned by Luis Carlos Mendiola Codina. XEPOR promptly moved to 740 kHz. Meneses Olaya acquired XEPOR in 2004.

XEPOR received approval to migrate to FM in 2010.

References

External links
Tprende 98.7 Twitter

Radio stations in Oaxaca
Radio stations in Mexico with continuity obligations